Nanwan Monkey Island is a state-protected nature reserve for macaque monkeys in Lingshui county on the south coast of Hainan, the southernmost province of China. While termed an island, the reserve is actually on the Nanwan peninsula bordering the Xincun harbour on the east and south. It is accessible by China's longest over-water cable car from Xincun, spanning .

Since the nature reserve was established in 1965, the reserve has become a popular tourist destination. It is now home to approximately 2,000 monkeys. The reserve, totalling 1,000 hectares, is China's largest area for raising and training monkeys. It is also the only island nature reserve that protects the endangered macaques species in the world.

References

External links

Geography of Hainan
Tourist attractions in Hainan
1965 establishments in China
Monkey parks